The Hawk is a 1931 American independent Western film directed by Jacques Jaccard and starring Norman Kerry, Nina Quartero and Frank Mayo. Given a limited initial release, it was re-edited and re-released under the alternative title The Phantom of Santa Fe in 1936.

Cast
 Norman Kerry as Miguel Morago - aka The Hawk
 Nina Quartero as Teresa Valardi
 Frank Mayo as Steve Gant
 Tom O'Brien as Killdane
 Fernando Valdez as Ramariez
 Carmelita Geraghty as Lolita
 Jack Mower as Capt. Rubio
 Charles Brinley as Pedro
 Steve Clemente as A Vaquero 
 Ben Corbett a Prisoner 
 Monte Montague as Henchman

References

Bibliography
 Pitts, Michael R. Western Movies: A Guide to 5,105 Feature Films. McFarland, 2012.

External links
 

1931 films
1931 Western (genre) films
American Western (genre) films
Films directed by Jacques Jaccard
American black-and-white films
1930s English-language films
1930s American films